Alan John Watling (born 23 July 1948) is a former Australian rules footballer who played 284 games for West Perth in the WANFL

Watling was mainly a ruck-rover but started his career on the wing from his debut in 1969. Strong overhead and possessing plenty of pace, he played in West Perth's 1969, 1971 and 1975 premiership teams.

A five time Western Australian interstate representative, Watling was an All-Australian at the 1972 Perth Carnival.

In 2000 he was named on the interchange bench in West Perth's official 'Team of the Century'.

External links

1948 births
Living people
All-Australians (1953–1988)
Australian rules footballers from Western Australia
West Australian Football Hall of Fame inductees
West Perth Football Club players